Phytoecia sibirica is a species of beetle in the family Cerambycidae. It was described by Gebler in 1842. It is known from Russia, Kazakhstan, and Ukraine.

References

Phytoecia
Beetles described in 1842